Falakata Polytechnic, established in 2001, is a government polytechnic located in Baganbari, Falakata, Alipurduar, West Bengal, India.

About college
This polytechnic is affiliated to the West Bengal State Council of Technical Education,  and recognised by AICTE, New Delhi. This polytechnic offers diploma courses in electrical, electronics & telecommunication, food processing technology, mechanical  and civil engineering.

See also
List of institutions of higher education in West Bengal
Education in India
Education in West Bengal
All India Council for Technical Education

References

External links
 Admission to Polytechnics in West Bengal for Academic Session 2006-2007
http://www.falakatapolytechnic.in/

Universities and colleges in Alipurduar district
Educational institutions established in 2001
2001 establishments in West Bengal
Technical universities and colleges in West Bengal